Erucius is a genus of "monkey grasshoppers" in the family Chorotypidae. Species in this genus can be found in Vietnam and Malesia, including the Philippines. It is the only genus in the subfamily Eruciinae.

Species

, subgenera and species include:

Erucius (Curieus) Bolívar, 1930
Erucius mjobergi Bolívar, 1944
Erucius tenuis Brunner von Wattenwyl, 1898
Eucius (Erucius) Stål, 1875
Erucius apicalis (Westwood, 1841) - type species (as Acridium agrionoides Haan)
Erucius bifasciatus Stål, 1877
Erucius brunneri Bolívar, 1914
Erucius dimidiatipes Bolívar, 1898
Erucius dusmeti Bolívar, 1930
Erucius erianthoides Bolívar, 1944
Erucius fruhstorferi Bolívar, 1930
Erucius labuanensis Bolívar, 1930
Erucius magnificus Rehn, 1904
Erucius moultoni Bolívar, 1930
Erucius pictus Saussure, 1903
Erucius sarawakensis Bolívar, 1944
Erucius singularis Bolívar, 1944
Erucius stali Bolívar, 1930
Erucius staudingeri Bolívar, 1930
Erucius vitreus (Westwood, 1841)
Erucius willemsei Bolívar, 1930

References

Chorotypidae
Caelifera genera
Insects of Southeast Asia